Transtage, given the United States Air Force designation SSB-10A, was an American upper stage used on Titan III rockets, developed by Martin Marietta and Aerojet.

History
Transtage was developed in anticipation of a requirement to launch military payloads to geostationary orbit; a contract for development of the stage was issued on 20 August 1962. Transtage used a pressure-fed two-chamber configuration, using Aerozine 50 fuel and nitrogen tetroxide as oxidizer; the thrust chambers were gimbaled for steering and each produced  of thrust. The design specification required up to three restarts during the first six hours of a mission.

Forty-seven Titan III launches are known to have used Transtage upper stages; of those, three are known to have suffered launch failures. The first launch, boosted by a Titan IIIA, occurred on 1 September 1964; the Transtage failed to pressurize, resulting in premature engine cutoff, and a failure to reach orbit. The second launch, on 10 December, was successful, and all ensuing launches used the Titan IIIC launch vehicle. The last launch of a Transtage was on 4 September 1989, boosted by a Titan 34D rocket.

See also
Centaur (rocket stage)
Inertial Upper Stage
RM-81 Agena

References

Citations

Bibliography

External links
Transtage at Encyclopedia Astronautica
Transtage at Gunter's Space Page

Rocket stages